Mikko Kokslien (born 10 March 1985) is a Norwegian nordic combined skier.

He won a bronze medal in the 4 x 5 km team event at the FIS Nordic World Ski Championships 2009 in Liberec and earned his best individual finish of 13th in the 10 km individual large hill at those same championships.

At the 2010 Winter Olympics in Vancouver, Kokslien finished 32nd in the 10 km individual normal hill and 39th in the individual large hill event.

He was the runner-up in the 2010–11 World Cup season.

His mother is a Finn (from Lahti) and Mikko speaks Finnish fluently. He represents the club Søre Ål IL.

References

External links

1985 births
Living people
Sportspeople from Lillehammer
Norwegian people of Finnish descent
Norwegian male Nordic combined skiers
Nordic combined skiers at the 2010 Winter Olympics
Nordic combined skiers at the 2014 Winter Olympics
Olympic Nordic combined skiers of Norway
FIS Nordic World Ski Championships medalists in Nordic combined
21st-century Norwegian people